The Byzantine lyra or lira was a medieval bowed string musical instrument in the Byzantine (Eastern Roman) Empire. In its popular form, the lyra was a pear-shaped instrument with three to five strings, held upright and played by stopping the strings from the side with fingernails. The first known depiction of the instrument is on a Byzantine ivory casket (900–1100 AD), preserved in the Bargello in Florence (Museo Nazionale, Florence, Coll. Carrand, No.26). Versions of the Byzantine lyra are still played throughout the former lands of the Byzantine Empire: Greece (Politiki lyra, lit. "lyra of the City" i.e. Constantinople), Crete (Cretan lyra), Albania, Montenegro, Serbia, Bulgaria, North Macedonia, Croatia (Dalmatian lijerica), Italy (Calabrian lira) and Armenia.

History
The most likely origin is the pear-shaped pandura, however with the introduction of a bow. The first recorded reference to the bowed lyra was in the 9th century by the Persian geographer Ibn Khurradadhbih (d. 911); in his lexicographical discussion of instruments he cited the lyra (lūrā) as the typical instrument of the Byzantines along with the urghun (organ), shilyani (probably a type of harp or lyre) and the salandj (probably a bagpipe). Together with the Arabic rebab, lira is considered by many as the ancestor of European bowed instruments.

The lyra spread widely via the Byzantine trade routes that linked the three continents; in the 11th and 12th centuries European writers use the terms fiddle and lira interchangeably when referring to bowed instruments. In the meantime, the rabāb, the bowed string instrument of the Arabic world, was introduced to Western Europe possibly through the Iberian Peninsula and both instruments spread widely throughout Europe giving birth to various European bowed instruments such as the medieval rebec, the Scandinavian and Icelandic talharpa. A notable example is the Italian lira da braccio, a 15th-century bowed string instrument which is considered by many as the predecessor of the contemporary violin.

Terminology
From the organological point of view, the Byzantine lyra is in fact an instrument belonging to the family of bowed lutes; however, the designation lyra (Greek: λύρα ~ lūrā, English: lyre) constitute of a terminological survival relating to the performing method of an ancient Greek instrument. The use of the term lyra for a bowed instrument was first recorded in the 9th century, probably as an application of the term lyre of the stringed musical instrument of classical antiquity to the new bowed string instrument.
The Byzantine lyra is sometimes informally called a medieval fiddle, or a pear-shaped rebec, or a kemanche, terms that may be used today to refer to a general category of similar stringed instruments played with a horsehair bow.

Characteristics
The Byzantine lyra had rear tuning pegs set in a flat peg similarly to the medieval fiddle and unlike the rabāb and rebec. However, the strings were touched by the nails laterally and not pressed from above with the flesh of the finger such as in the violin.
The lyra depicted on the Byzantine ivory casket of Museo Nazionale, Florence (900 – 1100 AD) has two strings and pear-shaped body with long and narrow neck. The soundboard is depicted without soundholes and as a distinct and attached piece, however this might be due to stylistic abstraction. The lyras of Novgorod (1190 AD) are closer morphologically to the present bowed lyras (see gallery): they were pear-shaped and 40 cm long; they had semi-circular soundholes and provision for three strings. The middle string served as a drone while fingering the others by finger or fingernail alone, downwards or sidewards against the string, for there was no fingerboard to press them against: a method which gives the notes as clearly as the violin and remains normal in lyras both in Asia as well as on present bowed instruments in post-Byzantine regions such as the Cretan lyra.

In use today
The lyra of the Byzantine empire survives in many post-Byzantine regions until the present day even closely to its archetype form. Examples are the Politiki lyra (i.e. lyra of the Polis, or City, referring to Constantinople) also known as the Classical kemence (Turkish: Klasik kemençe or Armudî kemençe) from Constantinople, used in today's Turkey and Greece, the Cretan lyra and the one used in the Greek islands of the Dodecanese, the gadulka in Bulgaria, the gusle in Serbia and Montenegro, the Calabrian lira in Italy, and the Pontic lyra (Greek: ποντιακή λύρα; Turkish: Karadeniz kemençe) in the Pontic Greek communities, that existed (or still exist) around the shores of the Black Sea. The gudok, a historical Russian instrument that survived until the 19th century, is also a variant of the Byzantine lyra.

Similarly to the lyras found at Novgorod, the Cretan lyra, the Gadulka, the Calabrian Lira and the Greek lyras of Karpathos, Macedonia, Thrace and Mount Olympus are manufactured from a single wood block (monoblock), sculpted into a pear-shaped body. The slightly rounded body of the lyra is prolonged by a neck ending on the top in a block which is also pear-shaped or spherical. In that, are set the pegs facing and extending forward. The soundboard is also carved with a shallower arch and has two small semi-circular, D-shaped soundholes. The Cretan lyra is probably the most widely used surviving form of the Byzantine lyra, except that in Crete instrument-making has been influenced by that of the violin. Currently, numerous models tend to integrate the shape of the scroll, the finger board and other morphology of some secondary characteristics of the violin.

The modern variants of the lyra are tuned in various ways: LA–RE–SOL (or a–d–g, i. e. by fifths) on the Cretan lyra; LA–RE–SOL (or a–d–g, where SOL [=g] is a perfect fourth higher than RE [=d] rather than a fifth lower) in Thrace and on Karpathos and the Dodecanese; LA–LA–MI (a–a–e, with the second LA [=a] an octave lower), in Drama; MI–SOL–MI (e–g–e, i. e. a minor third and a major sixth) on the gadulka; LA–RE–LA (a–d–a, a fifth and a fourth) on the Classical Kemenche.

Gallery

Notes

References
 
 
 
 
 
 

Bowed string instruments
Byzantine music
Early musical instruments
European music
Greek musical instruments